Pauline Inez Ovalle Mejía (born 15 March 1994) is an American-born Salvadoran footballer who plays as a defender. She has been a member of the El Salvador women's national team.

Early life
Ovalle was born in San Francisco, California.

International career
Ovalle capped for El Salvador at senior level during the 2012 CONCACAF Women's Olympic Qualifying Tournament qualification and the 2013 Central American Games.

See also
List of El Salvador women's international footballers

References

1994 births
Living people
Citizens of El Salvador through descent
Salvadoran women's footballers
Women's association football defenders
El Salvador women's international footballers
Soccer players from San Francisco
American women's soccer players
American sportspeople of Salvadoran descent
21st-century American women